Marc Schmit (born 13 July 1985) is a Laser sailor from Luxembourg. He competed at the 2008 Summer Olympics in Beijing, where he finished forty-second in the Laser class, with a score of 227 points.

Schmit achieved his best results in Laser sailing, when he finished twelfth at the 2006 Laser Europa Cup in Warnemünde, Germany. He is also a member of Yacht Club du G-D de Luxembourg.

References

External links
 
 
 
 

1985 births
Living people
Luxembourgian male sailors (sport)
Olympic sailors of Luxembourg
Sailors at the 2008 Summer Olympics – Laser
Sportspeople from Luxembourg City